is a city located in Niigata Prefecture, Japan. It is the second largest city in the prefecture, after the capital city of Niigata.

Geography

Nagaoka is in the center of Niigata prefecture and the surrounding Chūetsu region of Japan, between longitude 138°E and latitude 37°N. It is 80 minutes from Tokyo by way of the Joetsu Shinkansen or three hours on the Kan-Etsu Expressway and is considered a strategic traffic point in the region. Nagaoka was an inland city until January 1, 2006, when the city merged with four municipalities; two were touching the Sea of Japan. The Shinano River flows through the city from south to north and industrial development is on both banks of the river. The Higashiyama mountain range lies to the east.

Surrounding municipalities
 Niigata Prefecture
 Tsubame
 Yahiko
 Nishikan-ku, Niigata 
 Izumozaki
 Kashiwazaki
 Kariwa
 Tōkamachi
 Ojiya
 Uonuma
 Sanjō
 Mitsuke

Climate 
Nagaoka has a humid climate (Köppen Cfa) characterized by warm, wet summers and cold winters with heavy snowfall.

Demographics
Per Japanese census data, the population of Nagaoka peaked at around 1995 and has declined steadily since.

History

The area of present-day Nagaoka was part of ancient Echigo Province. Under the Tokugawa shogunate, a castle town was constructed by Hori Naoyori lord of Nagaoka Domain in 1616.  However, as the initial castle was located in an area prone to flooding by the Shinano River, a new castle was built at the site of present-day Nagaoka Station in 1617. Nagaoka flourished as under the reign of the 13 generations of the Makino clan during the Edo period. In the Boshin War of 1868 during the Meiji Restoration, Nagaoka Domain was a member of the Ōuetsu Reppan Dōmei against the imperial forces, and the city was reduced to rubble during the Battle of Hokuetsu. A gift of one hundred sacks of rice from a neighboring province was sold to finance a new school during the reconstruction of Nagaoka, from which the anecdote of Kome Hyappyo was born.

With the Meiji period creation of the modern municipalities system on April 1, 1889, the towns of Nagaoka and Nagaoka-honmachi were established. The two towns were merged on November 1, 1901 with the towns of Senju, Kusouzu, Ara, and village of Ouchi to form the modern town of Nagaoka, which was then raised to city status on April 1, 1906.

Municipal timeline 

 April 1, 1906: The city of Nagaoka is established.
 August 1, 1945: Nagaoka is reduced to rubble by 125 B-29 bombers in the Bombing of Nagaoka in World War II. 1,470 lives are lost.
 January 1963: A record-breaking heavy snowfall hits Nagaoka.
 November 15, 1982: Joetsu Shinkansen service arrives at Nagaoka Station.
 July 12–13, 2004: A heavy downpour causes extensive flooding in Nagaoka.
 October 23, 2004: The Chūetsu earthquake strikes, causing extensive damage in Nagaoka and surrounding areas.
 February 2005: Nagaoka experiences the heaviest snowfall in 19 years.
 April 1, 2005: The town of Oguni (from Kariwa District), the village of Yamakoshi (from Koshi District), the town of Nakanoshima (from Minamikanbara District), and the towns of Koshiji and Mishima (both from Santō District), were absorbed into Nagaoka. Prior to the merger, the size of Nagaoka was 262.45 km² and the population was 192,292.
 January 1, 2006: The city of Tochio, the towns of Teradomari and Yoita, and the village of Washima (all from Santō District) were absorbed into Nagaoka.
 April 1, 2007: Nagaoka is designated a special city with increase local autonomy
 March 31, 2010: The town of Kawaguchi (from Kitauonuma District) was absorbed into Nagaoka.

Government

Nagaoka has a mayor-council form of government with a directly elected mayor and a unicameral city legislature of 34 members. The city contributes six members to the Niigata Prefectural Assembly. In terms of national politics, the city is part of Niigata 5th district of the lower house of the Diet of Japan.

Economy

Industry 
The manufacturing industry prospered in Nagaoka following World War II, due in part to favorable location and good transportation infrastructure. Current industrial production includes precision instruments and machine tools.
 Nippon Seiki, a manufacturer of automotive instruments, is headquartered in Nagaoka.
 TDK-Lambda, a manufacturer of switched-mode power supplies, has a plant in Nagaoka.
Schlumberger, an oilfield services company has a location in Nagaoka.

Education

Universities and colleges
 Nagaoka University of Technology
 National Institute of Technology, Nagaoka campus
 Nagaoka University
 Nagaoka Institute of Design

Primary and secondary education
The city of Nagaoka operates 61 public elementary schools and 27 public middle schools. There is also one public middle school operated by the national government. Nagaoka also has nine public high schools operated by the Niigata Prefectural Board of Education and three private high schools. The prefecture also operates three special education schools in the city.

Transportation

Railway
East Japan Railway Company (JR East) – Joetsu Shinkansen

 JR East – Joetsu Line
 – <> –  –  – 
 JR East – Shin'etsu Main Line
 –  –  –  –  –  –  – 
 JR East – Echigo Line
 –  –  – 
 JR East –  Iiyama Line

Bus 
Local bus service in Nagaoka is managed by Echigo Kotsu. The bus terminal located at the east entrance of Nagaoka Station serves as the hub for the route network. Service extends to all parts of the city as well as many outlying suburban areas and villages. A bus service connecting Nagaoka Station to Niigata, Niigata Station runs at intervals of approximately 30 minutes. Additionally, long-distance bus services are available to all major cities in the prefecture as well as Tokyo.

Road

Expressway
Nagaoka JCT is a strategic interchange which connects two expressways, Hokuriku Expressway and Kan-Etsu Expressway.
 Hokuriku Expressway  – Ōzumi PA – Nagaoka JCT – Nagaoka-kita Bus stop – Nagaoka-kita IC(ETC Only) –  Nakanoshima-Mitsuke IC
  Kan-etsu Expressway  – Echigo-Kawaguchi IC/SA – Ojiya IC* – Nagaokaminami-Koshiji IC(ETC Only) – Nagaoka IC – Nagaoka JCT
Ojiya IC is in Ojiya city

Japan National Route

Twin towns – sister cities

Nagaoka is twinned with:

 Fort Worth, Texas, United States (1987)
 Honolulu, Hawaii,  United States (2002)
 Romainmôtier-Envy, Vaud, Switzerland (2006)
 Taiarapu-Ouest, French Polynesia (1991)
 Trier, Rhineland-Palatinate, Germany (2006)

Friendship city
 Bamberg, Upper Franconia, Germany (1995)

Local attractions

Places of interest 
 Kome Hyappyo Monument
 Tsuginosuke Kawai Monument in Yukyuzan Park
 Haibu Nagaoka Stadium
 The Niigata Prefectural Museum of Modern Art
 Niigata Prefectural Museum of History
 Yukyuzan Park
 National Government Echigo Hillside Park
 Nagaoka Lyric Hall
 Nagaoka City Local Museum

National Historic Sites
Tochio Castle ruins
Araya Site
Fujihashi Site
Umataka-Sanjūinaba Site
Hachimanbayashi Kanga ruins

Festivals 

 Nagaoka Festival and Grand Fireworks Festival (August)
 Nagaoka Aki Matsuri (Autumn Festival) and Kome Hyappyo Festival (October)

Notable people from Nagaoka 

 Ryō Hirohashi (voice actor)
 Tomoko Hoshino (actress)
 El Desperado (professional wrestler)
 Etsu Inagaki Sugimoto (writer)
 Inoue Enryō (Buddhist philosopher and founder of Toyo University)
 Yuki Kondo (mixed martial artist)
 Jūshirō Konoe (actor)
 Koharu Kusumi (Morning Musume)
 Haruo Minami (Enka singer)
 Nobuhiro Watsuki (manga artist)
 Isoroku Yamamoto (Commander of the Imperial Japanese Navy during the first four years of World War II)

References

External links 

Official Website 

 
Cities in Niigata Prefecture
Populated coastal places in Japan
Articles containing video clips